VWP may refer to:

 The United States Visa Waiver Program
 The Vietnam Workers Party
 NetBeans Visual Web Pack
 The VWP is the Vampires, Witches, and Pagans Party, founded by Jonathon Sharkey in 2005
 Voluntary Women Patrols → Women's Police Service